Leonardo Julien (born 9 September 2001) is a West Indian cricketer. He made his List A debut for West Indies B in the 2018–19 Regional Super50 tournament on 3 October 2018. In October 2019, he was named in the West Indies Emerging Team for the 2019–20 Regional Super50 tournament. In November 2019, he was named in the West Indies' squad for the 2020 Under-19 Cricket World Cup. He made his Twenty20 debut on 7 September 2021, for the Trinbago Knight Riders in the 2021 Caribbean Premier League.

References

External links
 

2001 births
Living people
West Indies B cricketers
West Indies Emerging Team cricketers
Trinbago Knight Riders cricketers
Place of birth missing (living people)